The Theban Tomb TT21 is located in Sheikh Abd el-Qurna, part of the Theban Necropolis, on the west bank of the Nile, opposite to Luxor. It is the burial place of the ancient Egyptian User, who was a scribe and steward of king Tuthmosis I during the early Eighteenth Dynasty. User's wife was named Bakt.

See also
 List of Theban tombs

References

Theban tombs